Merckx is a Dutch patronymic surname, from the given name Merk / Merkus, a regional form of Mark / Marcus. While in Belgium the spelling Merckx is dominant, in the Netherlands the variants Merks, Merkus, Merkx, and Merx are more common. Notable people with the surname include: 

Merckx
Axel Merckx (born 1972), Belgian racing cyclist, son of Eddy Merckx
Eddy Merckx (born 1945), Belgian racing cyclist, widely seen as the most successful in history
Eddy Merckx (billiards player) (born 1968), Belgian three-cushion billiards player
Guillaume Merckx (born 1918), Belgian basketball player
Jowan Merckx (born 1961), Belgian folk musician and recorder player
Ken Merckx (born 1964), American television and voice actor
 (born 1944), Belgian PVDA politician
 (born 1951), Belgian politician and judge
Merkus
Hendrik Merkus de Kock (1779–1845), Dutch Navy general and nobleman
Jeanne Merkus (1839–1897), Dutch social activist, philanthropist, and adventurer; daughter of Pieter Merkus
Pieter Merkus (1787–1844), Dutch colonial administrator; Governor-General of the Dutch East Indies 1841–44
Named after him in 1845: Merkus pine (Pinus merkusii), a pine tree native to Sumatra
Merkx
Ryan Merkx (born 1992), Dutch basketball player
Merx
Adalbert Merx (1838–1909), German Protestant theologian and orientalist
 (born 1988), Dutch racing bicyclist

See also
Named after the cyclist Eddy Merckx:
Eddy Merckx Cycles, a Belgian brand of high-end road bikes
Eddy Merckx in the Vicinity of a Cup of Coffee, 1973 Danish experimental short film
Eddy Merckx metro station, a Brussels metro station 
Grand Prix Eddy Merckx, a cycle race around Brussels
Les Fabuleux Exploits d'Eddy Merckx, a biographical comic
Merk (disambiguation)
Merck (disambiguation)

References

Dutch-language surnames
Patronymic surnames